Toropuku inexpectatus is a viviparous species of gecko found on the Coromandel Peninsula, New Zealand.

References 

inexpectatus
Animals described in 2020
Reptiles of New Zealand